Don Chicago is a 1945 British crime comedy film directed by Maclean Rogers and starring Jackie Hunter, Joyce Heron and Claud Allister. It is based on the novel by C. E. Bechhofer Roberts.

Plot

An aspiring but timid gangster is forced to leave the United States after crossing the wrong people, but upon arriving in Britain he is treated as a dangerous criminal.

Don Chicago steals the Crown Jewels from the Tower of London whilst on a day-trip. He infiltrates the BBC to make various announcements.

Cast
 Jackie Hunter as Don Chicago
 Eddie Gray as Police Constable Gray
 Joyce Heron as Kitty Mannering
 Claud Allister as Lord Piccadilly
 Amy Veness as Bowie Knife Bella
 Wylie Watson as Peabody
 Don Stannard as Ken Cressing
 Charles Farrell as Don Dooley
 Finlay Currie as Bugs Mulligan
 Cyril Smith as Flash Kelly
 Ellen Pollock as Lady Vanessa
 Moira Lister as Telephone Operator
 Wally Patch as Sergeant

References

External links

1945 films
Films directed by Maclean Rogers
1945 comedy films
British crime comedy films
British black-and-white films
Films set in London
Films set in Hampshire
Films scored by Percival Mackey
1940s British films